Brunetto Bucciarelli-Ducci (18 June 1914 – 4 February 1994) was an Italian politician and magistrate.

His name appears in the list of members of the P2 lodge found in Castiglion Fibocchi on 17 March 1981.

Biography
Bucciarelli-Ducci was born in Terranuova Bracciolini, Province of Arezzo. He graduated in law at the University of Florence in 1937. Subsequently he passed the competition for judicial auditor in 1940 and entered the judiciary.

During the Second World War he was called to arms as an artillery officer and subsequently served at the military tribunal of Bari, where he met Aldo Moro, then an airman assigned to the same tribunal, to whom he was always bound by a deep friendship. At the end of the war period he resumed his career as a magistrate as investigating judge at the Arezzo court.

In 1948 he was elected Deputy in the Siena-Arezzo-Grosseto constituency and reconfirmed continuously until the 6th parliamentary term, among the ranks of the Christian Democracy. In 1953 he became vice-chairman of the Christian Democratic group in the Chamber, led by Attilio Piccioni. On 12 June 1958 he was elected Vice-President of the Chamber of Deputies and was also confirmed in the subsequent parliamentary term. Following the appointment of President of Chamber Giovanni Leone as Prime Minister, in the session of 26 June 1963 Bucciarelli-Ducci was elected President of the assembly with a wide parliamentary consensus.

On 27 January 1977 he was elected judge of the Constitutional Court by Parliament in joint session, together with Alberto Malagugini and Oronzo Reale. He held the position until  31 January 1986.

He died in Arezzo on 4 February 1994 of a myocardial infarction

Honours and awards 
 : Knight of the Grand Cross of the Order of Merit of the Italian Republic (5 July 1976)

References 

1914 births
1994 deaths
People from the Province of Arezzo
Christian Democracy (Italy) politicians
Presidents of the Chamber of Deputies (Italy)
Deputies of Legislature I of Italy
Deputies of Legislature II of Italy
Deputies of Legislature III of Italy
Deputies of Legislature IV of Italy
Deputies of Legislature V of Italy
Deputies of Legislature VI of Italy
Politicians of Tuscany
Judges of the Constitutional Court of Italy
Propaganda Due